Shankaboot is an interactive web-based video series filmed in and around Beirut, Lebanon.  It is the world's first Arabic web drama series.

Series overview

Shankaboot follows Suleiman, a 15-year-old, delivery boy. Other characters include 19-year-old Ruwaida and the mysterious 20-something Chadi. The show presents Beirut life and the life in Lebanon in a realistic style. The show's creators cast actors with little to no prior acting experience for a naturalistic acting style.

Additional elements in Shankaboot
Between seasons, weekly  episodes called “Inside Shankaboot” were released. These short videos provided insight on the characters’ thoughts, desires, explanations to events and the comical endeavors that surrounded the production of the series.

In Autumn 2010, Shankaboot released “Shankactive”, an online forum and showcase platform for creative talent in the Middle East. This platform enabled Shankaboot viewers to participate in creating their own stories through various media and visual means. In parallel with the launch of “Shankactive”, young Lebanese were trained in video production and storytelling through a series of workshops.

Production
The production of the first season of Shankaboot took place in Beirut in December, 2009, largely in the area of Burj-Hammoud, a densely populated town on the Eastern borders of Beirut. The second season of Shankaboot was filmed in Beirut and the Bekaa Valley. The third season was filmed again in Beirut during July 2010. The fourth and fifth seasons were released in 2011.  Shankaboot was produced by Batoota Films in Association the BBC World Service Trust and The Welded Tandem Picture Company.

References

External links
 Official Website
 
 All episodes in French
 All episodes in German

2010 web series debuts
Comedy web series